Hoshcha is an urban-type settlement in Rivne Oblast (province) in western Ukraine. 

It serves as the administrative center of Hoshcha Raion (district), housing the district's local administration buildings. 

Its population was 5,121 at the 2001 Ukrainian Census. Current population:

History
Hoshcha was first founded in 1152 and it acquired the status of an urban-type settlement in 1957.

The jewish community
At the outbreak of World War II, Jewish refugees from the area arrived in the town.
On June 29, 1941, after Operation Barbarossa, the town was bombed by German planes, killing 165 Jews.
On July 4, the Germans entered the town, and began abducting Jews there for forced labor, and murdering other Jews.
The town's Jews were soon ordered to wear an armband with a Star of David, and a Judenrat was appointed in the town. Later, the town's Jews were transferred to an open ghetto.

In the first collection carried out by Ukrainian police in the town, on May 20, 1942, about 400 Jews were murdered. In the second gathering, held on September 25, 1942, about 350 Jews were murdered. In the third gathering held on November 14, 1942, 123 Jews were murdered. And about twenty Jewish professionals left in the town were murdered on July 17, 1943.

On January 18, 1944, the town was liberated by the Red Army. About twenty of the town's Jews survived hiding in the woods. Due to hostilities on the part of the local Ukrainians, these did not return to live in the town.

References

External links
 
 Hoshcha Ghetto on the Yad Vashem website

Urban-type settlements in Rivne Raion
Populated places established in the 12th century
Jewish communities destroyed in the Holocaust